The Macedonian Women's Handball Cup, is an elimination handball tournament held annually in North Macedonia since 1993. It is the second most important national title in Macedonian handball after the Macedonian First League. In 2018, Kometal Gjorče Petrov holds the record for most titles won with 16.

Winners

Season by season
Below is a list of Macedonian Cup winners since the season 1993.

Trophies by Club

See also 
 Macedonian First League
 Macedonian Men's Handball Cup

External links
 Macedonian Handball Federation 
 

Cup